The enzyme ADP-phosphoglycerate phosphatase (EC 3.1.3.28) catalyzes the reaction

3-(ADP)-2-phosphoglycerate + H2O  3-(ADP)-glycerate + phosphate

This enzyme belongs to the family of hydrolases, specifically those acting on phosphoric monoester bonds.  The systematic name is 3-(ADP)-2-phosphoglycerate phosphohydrolase. This enzyme is also called adenosine diphosphate phosphoglycerate phosphatase.

References

 

EC 3.1.3
Enzymes of unknown structure